This is a list of famous Hutus who have Wikipedia biographies which include mention of Hutu identity.

Africans other than Rwandans

Frédéric Bamvuginyumvira, First Vice-President of Burundi from 11 June 1998 to 1 November 2001.
Eugène Serufuli Ngayabaseka, Congolese politician.
Gervais Rufyikiri, Second Vice President of Burundi.
Agathon Rwasa, Burundian politician and military leader.
Adrien Sibomana, prime minister of Burundi (1998-1993).

Rwandans

Pasteur Bizimungu, President of Rwanda. 
Agathe Habyarimana, first lady of Rwanda (born 1953) 
Juvenal Habyarimana, President of Rwanda.
Joseph Kavaruganda, Rwandan judge.
Jacqueline Mukansonera, Rwandan human rights activist.

People convicted in connection with genocide

Théoneste Bagosora, Rwandan military officer, convicted in connection with Rwandan genocide.
Simon Bikindi, Rwandan singer-songwriter, convicted in connection with Rwandan genocide.
Froduald Karamira, Rwandan politician, convicted in connection with Rwandan genocide.
Hassan Ngeze, Rwandan journalist, convicted in connection with Rwandan genocide.

References

Lists of people by ethnicity
List